The Compagnie du chemin de fer de Caen à la mer (CM) was an early French railway company.

History
The first railway to reach Caen, on 18 November 1855, was the Chemins de fer de l'Ouest's line from Paris (Gare Saint-Lazare) and Mantes-la-Jolie to Cherbourg. In the early part of the 19th century only the country's main cities and towns were favoured by a rail service, but by the 1850s the local authorities in Calvados were demanding that the département be served by additional local railways for the benefit of industry.

The line "from Caen to the sea"
The CM's line in Calvados was inaugurated on 30 June 1875 and originally ran for 16 km between stations at Caen Saint-Martin and Luc-sur-Mer.

In July 1876, the line was extended by 8 km from Luc-sur-Mer to Courseulles.

A 4-km-long connection between the CM and the Ouest company's main line in Caen was opened on 12 September 1877 and several intermediate stations – at La Folie, Malon, Le Cizey, and Épron – were opened to passengers.

The beginning of difficulties

The company makes a profit during the summer season, but most services stop during World War I, with only 3 return trips operating. After the Armistice, normal operation resumed and the company diversified its operations with a bus service to provide a corresponding bus to its trains.

The economic difficulties of the 1920s brought the first deficit in 1930, then 1931. The State took over operations on 23 March 1933. The line was modernised between 1937 and 1938. On 9 August 1937, the concession was ended and powers transferred to the Courriers Normands, who signed a contract with the newly created SNCF to have its track maintained by the nationalised railways. Omnibus services were then transferred to buses and trains mainly circulating during the Summer season.

The line was little touched by World War II and although a few tank movements deteriorated the tracks, the military did replace the damaged sections for use by military trains. Civilians are once again accepted on the one daily passenger train in 1944 and the company finally took back their network on 21 December 1944.

In 1945, traffic was six times less than it was in 1938, although twice what it was in 1943, and most passengers were war veterans who benefited from free public transport.

Line openings

Stations
The line ran from Caen to Courseulles and served the following towns and villages:
 Caen (station)
 Couvrechef
 Cambes
 Mathieu (station)
 Douvres-la-Délivrande (station)
 Chapelle-la-Délivrande
 Luc-sur-Mer (station)
 Langrune-sur-Mer (station)
 Saint Aubin-sur-Mer (station)
 Bernières-sur-Mer (station)
 Courseulles-sur-Mer (station)

Rolling stock
The company possessed but a small fleet of steam locomotives; it was composed of four 0-6-0 engines built in 1875 by Fives-Lille specially for the line. A 0-6-0 Corpet-Louvet was received in 1883 to complete the fleet as well as 030-1392 of the Chemin de Fer de l'Ouest. Finally, a 0-6-0 St Léonard and a 0-6-0 Corpet Louvet built engines were received in 1927.

Passenger cars were Bidel wooden carriages of which twenty were double decker coaches, identical to those used on Réseau Saint-Lazare.

A few bogie carriages manufactured for the Chemin de fer de l'État for Paris-Courseulles direct services.

From 1924 the Chemin de Fer de Caen à la Mer equipped itself of DMUs. Their fleet of DMUs was composed of one Renault RS4 and four tyre Michelines. These were withdrawn in 1939.

References

 
 
 
 

Transport in Normandy
Railway companies of France
Railway lines opened in 1875
Standard gauge railways in France